The Boy on the Galloping Horse is a 2006 Polish drama film directed by Adam Guziński. It was screened out of competition at the 2006 Cannes Film Festival.

Cast
 Piotr Bajor - Jerzy
 Aleksandra Justa - Maria
 Krzysztof Lis - Janek
 Krzysztof Radkowski - Tomasz
 Bartlomiej Bobrowski - Young Writer
 Danuta Borsuk
 Alicja Gasior - Girl in the Shop
 Malgorzata Hajewska - Shopkeeper
 Marta Kalmus
 Marek Kasprzyk - Receptionist
 Wladyslaw Kowalski - Ward Manager
 Tadeusz Madeja - Old Man
 Stanislaw Penksyk - Bus Driver
 Anna Sarna
 Teresa Sawicka - Nurse
 Anna Seniuk - Nurse

References

External links

The Boy on the Galloping Horse on Filmweb
The Bot on the Galloping Horse on Film Polski

2006 films
2000s Polish-language films
2006 drama films
Films based on works by Tarjei Vesaas
Films directed by Adam Guziński
Polish drama films